Shinohara is a Japanese surname. Notable people with the surname include:

Chie Shinohara, Japanese manga artist
, Japanese actor and voice actor
Emi Shinohara (born 1963), Japanese voice actor
Futoshi Shinohara (born 1962), Japanese male marathon runner
Hiromichi Shinohara (1913–1939), fighter ace of the Imperial Japanese Army Air Service
Kazuo Shinohara (1925–2006), Japanese architect
, Japanese boxer
Luis Shinohara (born 1954), Brazilian judoka
Makoto Shinohara (born 1931), Japanese composer
Masato Shinohara, technician involved in the 1999 Tokaimura nuclear accident.
Ryoko Shinohara (born 1973), Japanese singer and actress
Shinichi Shinohara (born 1973), Japanese judoka
Sho Shinohara (born 1989), Japanese football player
Takashi Shinohara (born 1948), Japanese politician
Tetsuo Shinohara (born 1962), Japanese film director
Tomoe Shinohara (born 1979), Japanese singer, actress, fashion designer, producer and artist
Tōru Shinohara (born 1936), Japanese manga artist
Ushio Shinohara (born 1932), Japanese Neo-Dadaist artist
Yasunoshin Shinohara (1828–1911), Japanese samurai
, Japanese speed skater
Elena Shinohara (born April 6, 2000), Japanese-born American rhythmic gymnast and social media personality

See also
Battle of Shinohara
Shinohara Station (Shiga)
Shinohara Station (Kōchi)

Japanese-language surnames